Paul Nugent is a former Gaelic footballer who played at senior level for the Dublin county team. He was one of the selectors for the Dublin senior football team during Pat Gilroy's first season in charge in 2009. He played inter-county football for Dublin between 1988 and 1991, and played club football with Thomas Davis (winning three Dublin Senior Football Championship medals with them in 1989, 1990 and 1991). He played with the Dublin Junior team, which reached the All-Ireland Junior Football final in 1987 but failed to beat eventual winners Cork. Nugent was Thomas Davis senior football manager until Mick Bolan's appointment in December 2003.

References

Year of birth missing (living people)
Living people
Dublin inter-county Gaelic footballers
Gaelic football managers
Gaelic football selectors
Thomas Davis Gaelic footballers